The Rawlings Gold Glove Award, usually referred to as the Gold Glove, is the award given annually to the Major League Baseball players judged to have exhibited superior individual fielding performances at each fielding position in both the National League (NL) and the American League (AL), as voted by the managers and coaches in each league. Managers are not permitted to vote for their own players.  Eighteen Gold Gloves are awarded each year (with the exception of 1957, 1985, 2007 and 2018), one at each of the nine positions in each league. In 1957, the baseball glove manufacturer Rawlings created the Gold Glove Award to commemorate the best fielding performance at each position. The award was created from a glove made from gold lamé-tanned leather and affixed to a walnut base. Initially, only one Gold Glove per position was awarded to the top fielder at each position in the entire league; however, separate awards were given for the National and American Leagues beginning in 1958.

Keith Hernandez has won the most Gold Gloves at first base, capturing 11 consecutive awards in the National League from 1978 to 1988. In the American League, Don Mattingly won nine times with the New York Yankees for the second-highest total among first basemen, and George Scott won eight awards playing for the Boston Red Sox (three) and the Milwaukee Brewers (five). Vic Power, and Bill White each won seven awards; six-time winners include Wes Parker and J. T. Snow. Mark Teixeira has won five Gold Gloves at the position. Eddie Murray and Jeff Bagwell are the only members of the Baseball Hall of Fame to have won a Gold Glove at first base.

Among winners, Steve Garvey has made the most putouts in a season, with 1,606 in 1977. Murray leads American League winners in that category, with 1,538 in 1984. Kevin Youkilis has made the fewest errors in a season, also achieving the highest fielding percentage, when he went the entire 2007 season without an error for a fielding percentage of 1.000. Several players have made one error in a winning season, including Parker in 1968, Snow in 1998, Rafael Palmeiro in 1999, and Teixeira in 2012. Parker, Snow and Teixeira achieved a .999 fielding percentage in those seasons, as did Todd Helton in 2001. The player with the most errors in an award-winning season was Scott; he made 19 errors in 1967. Joey Votto made the most assists in a season, with 173 in 2011. The highest double play total in the major leagues belongs to Cecil Cooper, who turned 160 double plays in 1980.

Darin Erstad won a Gold Glove as a first baseman in 2004 after winning two awards in the outfield (2000, 2002), making him the only player to win the award as an infielder and an outfielder. In 1999, Palmeiro won the Gold Glove with the Texas Rangers while only appearing in 28 games as a first baseman; he appeared in 135 games as a designated hitter that season, resulting in some controversy over his selection. The oldest player to win at the position is Yuli Gurriel, who won the award for the Houston Astros at the age of 37 in 2021.

Key

American League winners

National League winners

Footnotes
The Brewers were members of the American League until 1997, when Commissioner Bud Selig offered the team the option to switch leagues due to a realignment of Major League Baseball's divisions. The Brewers have been members of the National League since 1998.
 Born Victor Pellot, he used the alias "Vic Power" during his career in MLB due to his experiences in Canada that drew laughs from fans due to his last name sounding similar to obscene slang
In 1957, Gold Gloves were given to the top fielders in Major League Baseball, instead of separate awards for the National and American Leagues; therefore, the winners are the same in each table.

References
General

Inline citations

External links
Rawlings Gold Glove Award Website

Gold Glove Award